Tedesco (Italian for "German") may refer to:
 2882 Tedesco, main-belt asteroid
 Tedesco gin, a variant of gin rummy
 Fondaco dei Tedeschi, headquarters and restricted living quarters of the German merchant population in Venice
 Tedesco (surname)
 Uva Tedesco, synonym for the Italian wine grape Marzemino